The 2018 Nebraska Danger season was the eighth season for the Nebraska Danger as a professional indoor football franchise and their eighth in the Indoor Football League (IFL). They were one of six teams that competed in the IFL for the 2018 season. The Danger played in the Eihusen Arena at the Heartland Events Center in Grand Island, Nebraska.

The Danger were led by head coach Mark Stoute in his first season with the Danger but was released on May 20 after losing six straight games. He was replaced for the rest of the season by coordinators Adam Shackleford and Pig Brown as co-coaches.

Despite losing their final nine games, the Dangers still made the four-team playoff and lost to the Iowa Barnstormers 48–17 in the league semifinal. After the season was complete, interim co-coach Pig Brown was promoted to the full-time head coach.

Standings

Schedule
Key:

Regular season
All start times are local time

Postseason

Roster

Staff

References

External links
 Nebraska Danger official website

Nebraska Danger
Nebraska Danger
Nebraska Danger